Litchfield Park can refer to:
 Litchfield Park, Arizona; or
 Litchfield Park, Northern Territory, a locality
 Litchfield National Park, Australia.